The Underworld is a 2018 Indian Assamese-language action thriller film  featuring Zubeen Garg and Parineeta Borthakur in lead roles. Directed by Rajesh Jashpal and produced by S J Studio & Entertainment Pvt. Ltd. & Raga Films, the film also features Biju Phukan, Nipon Goswami, Pabitra Rabha, Diganta Hazarika, Utpal Das and Baharul Islam.

Eros International, a global company in the Indian film entertainment industry, made its first venture into Assamese cinema by backing up The Underworld.

Cast 
Biju Phukan
Nipon Goswami
Zubeen Garg 
Parineeta Borthakur
Utpal Das
Diganta Hazarika
Pabitra Rabha
Lipika Borah
Kingkini

Soundtrack

Release 
The underworld movie was released on 5 October 2018, all over the Assam.

References

External links
 

2018 films
Films scored by Zubeen Garg
Indian action thriller films
Indian gangster films
2010s Assamese-language films
2018 action thriller films